Jodina is a genus of flowering plants belonging to the family Santalaceae.

Its native range is Bolivia to Southern Brazil and Southern South America. .

Species:
 Jodina rhombifolia (Hook. & Arn.) Reissek

References

Santalaceae
Santalales genera